A "Black Lives Matter" street mural has been painted in Springfield, Massachusetts.

History
The mural was painted in September 2020. It was vandalized twice within the month, and again in October.

See also

 2020 in art

References

2020 establishments in Massachusetts
2020 paintings
2020s murals
Black Lives Matter art
Murals in Massachusetts
Springfield, Massachusetts
Vandalized works of art in Massachusetts